Crook Hall, sited near Lanchester, County Durham, some  north west of the city of Durham, was one of two Roman Catholic seminaries which temporarily replaced the Douai seminary in Douai, France when that college was suppressed soon after the French Revolution. Crook Hall was itself superseded after a few years by Ushaw College.

History
The hall had belonged to the Baker family since 1635, when it was purchased by George Baker, Knt., the second son of Oswald Baker of Durham. George Baker served as a recorder of Newcastle-on-Tyne and was a defender of that town for King Charles. His son George inherited the estate in 1667. George Baker MP, grandson of the original owner and member of parliament for Durham City, remodelled the house in 1716.
 

When the Douai Catholic seminary closed in 1793 the students were hastily brought back to England with the intention of creating a new seminary there. The mansion was at that time unoccupied since Baker had moved his primary residence to Elemore Hall.

They studied under the guidance of Thomas Eyre, one of the former professors, John Lingard, the future historian and John Daniel, the president of Douai at its suppression. After ten years Crook Hall proved inadequate and in 1804 Bishop William Gibson began the building of Ushaw College at nearby Ushaw Moor, to which the college transferred in 1808. 

The local village of Crookhall developed as coal and iron ore deposits were exploited. The hall was purchased by the Consett Iron Company in 1877 and demolished circa 1900.

References

Catholic seminaries
Buildings and structures in County Durham
Consett